Mohamad Maliki bin Osman (Jawi: مالكي عثمان; born 1965) is a Singaporean politician and former assistant professor who has been serving as Minister in the Prime Minister's Office, Second Minister for Education and Second Minister for Foreign Affairs since 2020. A member of the governing People's Action Party (PAP), he has been the Member of Parliament (MP) representing the Siglap division of East Coast GRC since 2011.

Before entering politics in the 2001 general election, Maliki was an assistant professor at the National University of Singapore's Department of Social Work and Psychology. After he was elected, he served in various positions at the Ministries of Defence, Foreign Affairs, and National Development before he became a full minister in 2020.

Education
Maliki attended Duchess Primary School, Dunearn Secondary Technical School and First Toa Payoh Secondary School before graduating from the National University of Singapore (NUS) with a Bachelor of Arts degree, a Bachelor of Social Sciences degree with honours and a Master of Social Sciences degree. He subsequently went on to complete a PhD in social work at the University of Illinois Urbana-Champaign in 1998.

Career 
Maliki worked as an assistant professor in NUS's Department of Social Work and Psychology from 1998 to 2004.

Political career 
Maliki was first elected to Parliament at the 2001 general election. In 2004, Maliki was appointed Parliamentary Secretary for Health (2004–2005) and Community Development, Youth and Sports (2004–2006). He was subsequently appointed Parliamentary Secretary for National Development (2005–2010).

In 2010, Maliki was promoted from Parliamentary Secretary to Senior Parliamentary Secretary for National Development. As part of his National Development portfolio, Maliki chaired the main Workgroup for the Geylang Serai redevelopment project, which included a Civic Centre Subgroup that oversaw the concept, design and facilities for the new civic centre - Wisma Geylang Serai. Following the 2011 general election, in addition to his portfolio at the Ministry of National Development, he also became Senior Parliamentary Secretary for Defence and Mayor of the South East District. In February 2013, Maliki launched a commemorative publication titled "The Making of Wisma Geylang Serai", and a design competition for the new civic centre. Maliki was tasked with chairing the workgroup on "Recognition and Benefits for NS" as part of the Committee on Strengthening National Service at the Ministry of Defence.

On 1 September 2013, after a Cabinet reshuffle, Maliki was promoted from Senior Parliamentary Secretary to Minister of State for Defence and National Development.

Following the 2015 general election, Maliki was promoted to Senior Minister of State for Defence and Foreign Affairs on 1 October 2015, relinquishing his previous post at the Ministry of National Development.

After 2020 Singapore general election, Maliki was promoted to Minister in the Prime Minister’s Office, Second Minister for Education and Second Minister for Foreign Affairs.

Personal life 
Maliki is married to Sadiah Shahal and has two children, Lidia Syahindah and Adli Mifzal.

References

External links 
 Maliki Osman on Parliament of Singapore
 

Members of the Parliament of Singapore
People's Action Party politicians
Singaporean people of Malay descent
Singaporean Muslims
1965 births
Living people
National University of Singapore alumni
University of Illinois School of Social Work alumni
Academic staff of the National University of Singapore
Members of the Cabinet of Singapore